Ravennaside, at 601 S. Union St. in Natchez, Mississippi, was built in 1902.  It is Classical Revival in style.  It was listed on the National Register of Historic Places in 1979.

The property includes a barn, a blacksmith shop, and a cottage to the rear which are older and are associated with the history of Ravenna, on an adjacent property.

It was home of Roane Fleming Byrnes (1890-1970), who was active in  historic preservation and race relations and is also known for her promotion of the Natchez Trace Parkway.

Ravennaside has been listed as having been built in c.1900.

Ravennaside's address has been given as 601 South Union Street.  It is one of three houses which were originally part of a family compound, along with Ravenna Cottage at 4 Ravenna Lane and Ravenna, which has been listed at 8 Ravenna Lane and also at 601 South Union Street.  All three are included in the 1999-listed Downriver Residential Historic District.

References

National Register of Historic Places in Natchez, Mississippi
Neoclassical architecture in Mississippi
Houses completed in 1902
Houses on the National Register of Historic Places in Mississippi
Individually listed contributing properties to historic districts on the National Register in Mississippi
Houses in Natchez, Mississippi
Blacksmith shops